Choi Yuen Ling (born 3 February 1977) is a Hong Kong Paralympic archer.

She has competed at the Summer Paralympics and other championships.

References

Archers at the 2016 Summer Paralympics
Living people
Hong Kong female archers
1977 births